George Hanlon (July 1917 – 28 January 2010) was an Australian race horse trainer. Inducted in the Australian Racing Hall of Fame in 2002, Hanlon trained three Melbourne Cup winners; Piping Lane in 1972, Arwon in 1978 and Black Knight in 1984.

Born in South Australia, Hanlon died in 2010, aged 92, at a nursing home in Geelong, Victoria where he had been living for the past year and a half.

References

1917 births
2010 deaths
Australian racehorse trainers
Sportspeople from Geelong
Australian Thoroughbred Racing Hall of Fame inductees